Brunstad Christian Church (BCC) is a worldwide evangelical non-denominational Christian church. Established in Norway early in the 20th century. It is represented by more than 220 churches in 54 countries. An overview of members per country shows a total of 20,000 members in 2016. As many as two thirds of its members live outside Norway. For many years the group did not have a formal name and was referred to as Smith's Friends, particularly in Norway.

History

Johan Oscar Smith (1871–1943), the church's founder, was originally a member of the Methodist church. After a religious conversion in 1898 Smith began preaching to small gatherings. In 1905, his brother Aksel Smith (1880–1919) joined him. Smith had early contact with the Pentecostal movement in Norway and Aksel Smith cooperated with Thomas Ball Barratt during the first few years after Barratt introduced Pentecostalism to Norway in 1906–1907. As both the Pentecostal movement and Smith's group developed, they became increasingly wary of each other, with Barrat accusing Smith of creating schism within his group, as some of his followers joined Smith. During the following years both groups wrote and published articles against the other.

In 1908, Johan Oscar Smith met Elias Aslaksen (1888–1976) while serving in the Norwegian Navy. Under the leadership of Johan Oscar Smith, Aksel Smith, and Elias Aslaksen the group began to grow quickly.  During World War I, Smith, as a Naval officer, partook in patrols of the Norwegian coast.  During this time, he had contact with believers and churches were established in several Norwegian coastal towns.  During the 1930s churches were established in inland Norway, most notably in Hallingdal and Valdres.  During this period, congregations were also established in Denmark.

From the 1950s, the church began to spread throughout Western Europe, most notably in Germany, Switzerland, and the Netherlands, after several church leaders were invited to participate in the Pentecostal conferences held at Leonberg during the 1950s.  In the 1960s and 1970s, the Brunstad Christian Church spread further to Eastern Europe, the United Kingdom, North America, Australia, Africa and Asia.  Churches were first established in South America in the 1970s.

Today, there are more than 220 congregations in more than 65 countries.  The church has annual international conferences at Oslofjord Convention Center and regional conferences throughout the world. It has its own publishing house, publishing books and distributing audio-visual media intended for spiritual edification. The monthly journal , ('Hidden Treasures') has been published every month since 1912.

Organization 
Brunstad Christian Church is an association of some 220 churches worldwide. The church has no ordained clergy and few members have any theological training. Leaders are appointed in each local church congregation on the basis of their perceived virtue, the confidence of members in the individual and their natural abilities. There are no elected leaders. The church is non-denominational and has little formal association with other churches.

Members worldwide 
BCC has members in Argentina, Aruba, Australia, Austria, Belarus, Brasil, Bulgaria, Cameroon, Canada, Chile, China, Congo, Croatia, Czech Republic, Denmark, Egypt, England, Estonia, Ethiopia, Finland, France, Germany, Greece, Hong Kong, Hungary, India, Indonesia, Israel, Italy, Kenya, Kyrgyzstan, Mexico, Moldova, Montenegro, Netherlands, New Zealand, Norway, Peru, Poland, Romania, Russia, Serbia, Singapore, Slovenia, South Africa, Spain, Sri Lanka, Sweden, Switzerland, Tanzania, Turkey, Ukraine, United Arab Emirates, USA.

This is an unofficial list of 'members':

Teachings

Brunstad Christian Church places its basis of faith in the New Testament and the belief that the Bible is the word of God. The fundamental elements of their faith are: faith in Jesus as God's son, faith in the Holy Spirit, forgiveness of sin, baptism and the Lord's Supper.  They believe that the forgiveness of sins is undeserved and by received through Divine grace when one believes in Jesus Christ.  They practice the baptism of adults by complete immersion into water.

As in other evangelical churches, the Bible is central and believed literally.  Books and writings by past and present elders in the movement are held in high regard within Brunstad Christian Church. The most central internal publications are the monthly magazine,  and Smith's Letters, a collection of letters written by Johan O. Smith, mostly to his brother Aksel and Elias Aslaksen.

The church claims to differ from other non-denominational evangelical groups in its belief that Jesus not only died to bring forgiveness of our sins, but that he was also tempted to sin just like every human being.  The church teaches that Jesus' victory over sin as a human being is the basis for personal victory over sin and transformation into Jesus image for believers, which is defined as the process of sanctification. 
A study undertaken by Norwegian theologian Geir Lie concluded that the theology of Brunstad Christian Church was influenced by the Keswick revival at the turn of the 20th century and by individuals such as Madame Guyón and Jessie Penn-Lewis.

Mission

Brunstad Christian Church is actively engaged in missionary and humanitarian work around the globe.  According to their official website, they are careful not to mix their missionary work and humanitarian aid in an effort to ensure that people are not influenced to a particular teaching or religion simply by the material goods the missionaries have to offer.  Moreover, the church states that it believes in "preaching the gospel without necessarily giving people hope of better living conditions" and, for this reason, "channel money or material goods through social or public organisations where distribution of goods takes place according to need, and not according to religious persuasion".

Youth Exchange Program

The Youth Exchange Program (YEP) is an initiative within Brunstad Christian Church where young people from affiliated churches around the world volunteer a year to work in church-related activities and projects.  According to the church's website, the program mainly consists of missionary work, Norwegian language lessons, volunteer work, culture exchange and network building. The purpose of the program is to "obtain better knowledge of  the church's basis of faith and its history" and to "teach and spread knowledge of international languages and culture". The program was founded in connection with the expansion of Oslofjord Convention Center and has since been expanded, so that participants are involved in missionary work and church activities in many different parts of the world. including the construction projects at  local church properties. Each year, approximately 250 young people aged 18 to 25 years are invited to take part in the program.

Controversy
A 2020 documentary by Norwegian state broadcaster NRK raised questions about whether BCC is a sect, and alleged that church leaders were benefiting economically from the church in a manner that could be illegal.
The BCC denied the allegations, and claim that they are part of a misinformation campaign run by the private Israeli intelligence company Psy-Group on behalf of an ex-member.

Bibliography

Bratli, Kjell Arne (1996): The Way of the Cross: An Account of Smith's Friends. Tananger, Norway: Skjulte Skatters Forlag. 
Gjøsund, Alf (2004). Seier Likevel: Min Vei ut av Trossamfunnet Smiths Venner (Victory after all: My Way Out of Smith's Friends Fellowship) (Norwegian). Lunde. 
Velten, Johan (2002). Ansatt av Gud: Et Kritisk Søkelys på Smiths Venner (Appointed by God: A Critical Review of Smith's Friends) (Norwegian). Genesis.

References

External links 

 Official website in English
 Missionary website

 
Evangelicalism in Norway
Christian organizations established in 1905
Evangelical denominations established in the 20th century
1905 establishments in Norway
Evangelical denominations